Marine and Petroleum Geology is a peer-reviewed scientific journal covering marine and petroleum geology. It was established in 1984 and is published by Elsevier.

Abstracting and indexing
The journal is abstracted and indexed in:

According to the Journal Citation Reports, the journal has a 2017 impact factor of 3.281.

References

External links
 

Geology journals
English-language journals
Marine geology
Petroleum geology
Bimonthly journals
Elsevier academic journals
Publications established in 1984